The former Manchester Law Library is a Grade II* listed building in the Venetian Gothic style at 14 Kennedy Street, Manchester. The building is notable as having housed the oldest provincial law library in England. Its architect, Thomas Hartas, is little known, and the former Law Library appears to be his only documented building. In 2015 the Manchester Incorporated Law Library Society sold the premises, and moved to new offices on Booth Street.

History and description

Designed by Thomas Hartas, the library was built by William Holt between 1884 and 1885 to provide a meeting place, and reading room, for the Manchester Law Society. The building has a fine Venetian Gothic facade, "three bays, each divided into three again with richly traceried and strongly moulded frames to the openings".  Internally, a lending library is located on the ground floor, "now with twentieth century furnishings. On the first floor, a reading room "with most of the (slightly rearranged) attractive, original fittings." These include the central oak table, three fireplaces, and tall bookcases, some set at right angles to the walls to maximise the available storage space. The "stained glass is a noteworthy feature (including) three roundels containing the images of bewigged judges". Offices are above this. "The building is noteworthy by virtue of having been built for the purposes of a law library and, London and the old universities aside, it is believed to have performed this function for a period longer than any other provincial law library".

Thomas Hartas is an elusive architect and the library appears to be his only documented building. He has no entry in the RIBA Directory of British Architects 1834-1914 an exhaustive survey of practising architects of the Victorian era. The library is a Grade II* listed building.

In 2015 the building was put up for sale.  The Law Library relocated to new premises on Booth Street where it remains a private library open only to subscribing members of the legal profession.

See also

Grade II* listed buildings in Greater Manchester
Listed buildings in Manchester-M2

Notes

References

External links 
 

Grade II* listed buildings in Manchester
Libraries in Manchester
Library buildings completed in 1885
Law libraries in the United Kingdom
Gothic Revival architecture in Greater Manchester
Venetian Gothic architecture in the United Kingdom